JS Maya (DDG-179) is the lead ship of her class of guided missile destroyer in the Japan Maritime Self-Defense Force (JMSDF). She was named after Mount Maya and shares her name with a World War II heavy cruiser.

Development 
The announcement of a new destroyer class was in August 2015 with the name 27DDG. She was laid down by Japan Marine United in Yokohama, Kanagawa on April 14, 2017, and was launched on July 30, 2018. She was commissioned on March 19, 2020.

On 16 November 2022, the guided-missile destroyer  fired an SM-3 Block IIA missile, successfully intercepting the target outside the atmosphere in the first launch of the missile from a Japanese warship. On 18 November 2022, the  likewise fired an SM-3 Block IB missile with a successful hit outside the atmosphere. Both test firings were conducted at the Pacific Missile Range Facility on Kauai Island, Hawaii, in cooperation with the U.S. Navy and U.S. Missile Defense Agency. This was the first time the two ships conducted SM-3 firings in the same time period, and the testes validated the ballistic missile defense capabilities of Japan’s newest s.

Gallery

References 

Maya-class destroyers
Ships built by Japan Marine United
2018 ships